Dryophytes arboricola, commonly known as the arboreal treefrog, is a species of frog in the family Hylidae endemic to the Sierra Madre del Sur in Guerrero state, Mexico.

Dryophytes arboricola is a poorly known frog. It is assumed to be a montane forest species that breeds in temporary pools. It is probably impacted by habitat loss.

References

Dryophytes
Endemic amphibians of Mexico
Fauna of the Sierra Madre del Sur
Amphibians described in 1941
Taxonomy articles created by Polbot